On Friday, September 16, 1988, Tom Browning of the Cincinnati Reds pitched the 12th perfect game in Major League Baseball (MLB) history, blanking the Los Angeles Dodgers 1–0 at Riverfront Stadium. Browning became the first left-handed pitcher to pitch a perfect game since Sandy Koufax's perfect game in 1965. As of 2022, this perfect game is also the only one in Major League history to be pitched on artificial turf.

Background
Browning was in his fifth season in MLB, having made his debut in September 1984 with the Reds. Through the end of the 1987 season, he had a career record of 45–35 with a 3.95 ERA. Coming into his September 16, 1988, start at home against the Dodgers, he had a season record of 15–5 with 3.56 ERA in 32 starts. His most recent start had been an eight-inning no decision five days earlier, also against the Dodgers, in a road game at Dodger Stadium.

The Reds nearly had a perfect game earlier in the season, as starting pitcher Ron Robinson retired the first 26 Montreal Expos he faced at home on May 2, 1988. With two outs in the top of the ninth inning, pinch hitter Wallace Johnson singled to left field on a full count, breaking up the bid. Tim Raines then homered, narrowing the Reds' lead to 3–2. Relief pitcher John Franco then got Johnny Paredes to ground out for the final out.

Browning had a bid for a no-hitter broken up earlier in the season. On June 6, 1988, against the San Diego Padres at Jack Murphy Stadium, Browning took a no-hitter into the ninth inning. Tony Gwynn singled with one out; it was the only hit Browning allowed in defeating the Padres, 12–0.

Entering the September 16 game, the Dodgers had an 84–60 record, while the Reds were at 76–69. It was the first game of a three-game series between the teams.

The game

A two-hour, 27 minute rain delay forced the game to start at approximately 10 PM local time. The rain delay lasted longer than the game itself, played in a brisk one hour, 51 minutes. 

The game's lone run came with two outs in the bottom of the sixth inning. Batting against Dodger starter Tim Belcher, himself working on a no-hitter, Reds shortstop Barry Larkin doubled and advanced to third on Chris Sabo's infield single; an error by Dodger third baseman Jeff Hamilton on the play enabled Larkin to score.

In the top of the seventh inning, Dodger left fielder Kirk Gibson was ejected by home plate umpire Jim Quick after striking out.

In the top of ninth inning, Browning first got Rick Dempsey to fly out to right field. Steve Sax then grounded out to the shortstop. Facing pinch hitter Tracy Woodson, Browning recorded his seventh strikeout of the evening, completing the perfect game.

Browning threw 70 of his 102 pitches for strikes with Catcher Jeff Reed behind the plate and did not run the count to three balls on a single Dodger hitter.

Later developments
The Dodgers would go on to win the 1988 World Series—the only time, to date, that a team has won a World Series after having a perfect game pitched against it during the season. Only one other team has since earned a postseason berth after having a perfect game pitched against it during the season: the 2010 Tampa Bay Rays, who were on the losing end of Dallas Braden's perfect game on May 9, went on to win the American League East title. Not until Sean Manaea of the Oakland Athletics no-hit the eventual World Champion Boston Red Sox on April 21, 2018, would a no-hitter again be pitched against a team that would go on to win that year's World Series.

Browning's perfect game was the first of a record three that Paul O'Neill would play in as a member of the winning team. With the New York Yankees, he would be on the winning end of David Wells' and David Cone's in 1998 and 1999, respectively.

On July 4, 1989, Browning narrowly missed becoming the first pitcher to throw two perfect games. Against the Philadelphia Phillies at Veterans Stadium, Browning retired the first 24 batters he faced. Dickie Thon then broke up the bid with a ninth-inning leadoff double. After striking out Steve Lake, Browning gave up a single to Steve Jeltz, scoring Thon. John Franco then relieved Browning and got Len Dykstra to hit into a game-ending double play, giving the Reds a 2–1 win.

Browning pitched for the Reds through 1994, and finished his career with the 1995 Kansas City Royals. His MLB totals include an overall record of 123–90, 3.94 ERA, and exactly 1,000 strikeouts in 1,921 innings pitched.

Line score

References

Further reading

External links
Box score at Retrosheet

1988 Major League Baseball season
Cincinnati Reds
Los Angeles Dodgers
1980s in Cincinnati
1988 in sports in Ohio
Major League Baseball perfect games
September 1988 sports events in the United States
Baseball competitions in Cincinnati